The Windsor Court Hotel is a luxury hotel in the Central Business District of New Orleans, Louisiana. The building rises 253 feet (77 m). It contains 23 floors, and was completed in 1984. In 2011, Travel + Leisure magazine ranked the Windsor Court as the 6th Best Large City Hotel in the United States and Canada. Windsor Court Hotel currently stands as the 37th-tallest building in the city, and the 10th-tallest hotel. The building is an example of modern architecture.

The building houses a 4-star hotel with 324 guest rooms and features an extensive collection of European art and antiques valued at more than $8 million.

The hotel was one of the least damaged buildings of New Orleans when Hurricane Katrina made impact, suffering only minimal damage and escaping floodwaters. The damage included broken windows in the upper floors and minor flooding from rain that fell inside as a result of the broken windows.

History 
The hotel opened in 1984 by Morris Architects. In 2009 an investment team purchased the hotel, led by The Berger Company and Crow Holdings. In 2011-2012 the hotel underwent a renovation. It was a $22 million project that updated the guestrooms and the lounge, as well as revitalized the pool area, and added The Spa at Windsor Court. In 2018 the hotel underwent another renovation, worth $15 million that included the addition of a Poolside Bar, and the renovation of all the hotel's rooms.

Restaurants & Bars 
The hotel has several dining establishments, including The Grill Room - which is the only AAA Four-Diamond and Forbes Five-Star rated restaurant in the city. The hotel's second-floor Polo Club Lounge is also a popular location for live jazz music and is known for its artwork collection. In 2010, a 2x Super Bowl Champion, a British rockstar, and a maritime attorney had dinner with each other here. Afternoon tea is served on weekends in Le Salon.

See also
 List of tallest buildings in New Orleans
 Buildings and architecture of New Orleans

References

External links
 Official site

Skyscraper hotels in New Orleans
Hotels established in 1984
Hotel buildings completed in 1984